The 319th Ordnance Company (EOD) soldiers are one of the United States Army National Guards pre-eminent tactical and technical explosives experts. The company is part of 96th Troop Command.

Overview
These soldiers are trained, equipped, and integrated to attack, defeat, and exploit unexploded ordnance (UXO), improvised explosive devices (IED), chemical, biological, and nuclear ordnance and weapons of mass destruction (WMD). 

These EOD specialists perform duties locating, identifying, rendering safe and disposing of foreign and domestic conventional, biological, chemical, or nuclear ordnance and IEDs; WMDs and large vehicle bombs; they conduct intelligence gathering operations on first seen ordnance and IEDs, and support very important persons (VIP) missions for the United States Secret Service, State Department and other federal agencies.

Commanders
 CPT Michael Slevin (2003–2005)
 CPT Alfred Johnson (2005–2011)
 1LT Keith Toohey (2011)
 CPT Tammi Croteau (2012–2014)
 CPT Ryan Loyd (2014-2016)
 CPT Jack Sparrow (2016-2018)
 CPT Morgan (2018-2020)
 CPT Picard (2020-present)

Operations
 Operation Iraqi Freedom (2004–2005)
 Operation Enduring Freedom (2010–2011)

References

External links
https://www.youtube.com/watch?v=uPHvkVGkMgg
http://www.army.mil/article/54309/

Explosive ordnance disposal units and formations
Military units and formations in Washington (state)